Eysteinn Sigurðarson  is an Icelandic actor appearing as Hjálmar in the Icelandic mystery drama series Trapped (Ófærð) and as Sigtryggr, a Danish warlord, in The Last Kingdom.

Early life
Eysteinn Sigurðarson (Sigurdarson) was born in Reykjavik, Iceland, and was raised in Madison, Wisconsin, US. He attended the University of Wisconsin where he studied English and Creative Writing, before deciding to go into the performing arts. He headed back to Reykjavik, Iceland, to enroll at the Iceland University of the Arts, graduating in 2015 with a BA degree in Acting. As a student he performed at the Reykjavík City Theatre on many reproductions of plays including  Pippi Longstocking ,  Who's Afraid of Virginia Woolf?  and   Mamma Mia! . Sigurðarson also completed a 5-week Improv Intensive at iO Theatre, Chicago

Career
Sigurðarson's debut screen appearance was in 2015 as Hjálmar in the Icelandic mystery drama series Trapped (Ófærð )
In 2017, Sigurðarson landed a main role as Halldór in the Arnaud Siad directed short film Örmagna, which was an official selection of the Reykjavík International Film Festival 2017.
Sigurdarson's breakthrough role came in the Mary Reyndal directed Icelandic television series Mannasiðir (Manners) where he played an Icelandic schoolboy; his performance in the series earned him a nomination for Male leading role at the Icelandic Film and Television Academy Edda Awards. 
In 2020, Sigurðarson played a main role of Sigtryggr the Danish warlord, in season 4 and 5 of The Last Kingdom (TV series).

Personal life
Eysteinn Sigurðarson is currently living in London, UK, and is in a relationship with fellow actress Salome Gunnarsdóttir, whom he met at the Iceland University of the Arts, in Reykjavík.

Filmography

Film

Television

Awards and nominations

References

External links
 
 Eysteinn Sigurðarson Instagram

21st-century Icelandic male actors
Icelandic male film actors
Icelandic male stage actors
Icelandic male television actors
Living people
People from Reykjavík
Year of birth missing (living people)